Giuseppe Pira (born 13 July 1992) is an Italian footballer who plays for ASD Canicatti in the Eccellenza.

References

External links
 
 
 Giuseppe Pira at Calciolandia Sicilia

1992 births
Living people
Italian footballers
Italian expatriate footballers
S.P.A.L. players
FC Botev Vratsa players
S.S.D. Città di Gela players
Serie D players
Eccellenza players
First Professional Football League (Bulgaria) players
Association football defenders
Italian expatriate sportspeople in Bulgaria
Expatriate footballers in Bulgaria